Beneath the Scars is the fourth studio album by the rock music group 12 Stones. It was released on May 22, 2012.  The album was produced by Skidd Mills, who produced the band's previous album Anthem for the Underdog.

The album's first single "Bulletproof" was released on July 12, 2011. The second single "Worlds Collide" was released on February 7, 2012, followed by "Infected" on February 28, 2012.

The release of Beneath the Scars was delayed several times. Originally titled Only Human, it was first scheduled for release on August 23, 2011 but then delayed to September 6, 2011. It was later postponed to be remixed and remastered and then given a new release date of March 27, 2012. The album was eventually released on May 22, 2012 digitally and May 29, 2012 physically.

Track listing

Personnel

Band
Paul McCoy – lead vocals
 Eric Weaver – lead guitar
Brad Reynolds – bass

Other
 Justin Rimer – bass guitar
Skidd Mills – producer
Johnny K – mixing
Mike Shipley – mixing
Brad Blackwood - mastering
Jacob Cap – executive producer
 Jimmy Swan – executive producer

References

2012 albums
12 Stones albums